Gencor ACP Ltd v Dalby [2000] EWHC 1560 (Ch) is a UK company law case concerning piercing the corporate veil.

Facts
Mr Dalby was a director of the ACP group of companies, including Gencor ACP Ltd. He dishonestly diverted assets and opportunities to his British Virgin Islands company. Gencor ACP sought to force him and his company to repay the money. He also paid his son £24,000 a year for work, even though the son was still in school.

Judgment
Rimer J held that Mr Dalby and the offshore company must return the benefits. Mr Dalby could only have escaped liability if he had obtained the consent of ACP's shareholders for his actions. Both Mr Dalby and his Virgin Islands company were liable to account to ACP for the diverted money and lifting the corporate veil on the Virgin Islands company was appropriate since it was directly controlled by Mr Dalby and in reality functioned as his offshore bank account.

The payment to Mr Dalby's son was invalid because it was an unauthorised salary increase, in effect, for Mr Dalby. He had made the arrangement to reduce his tax liability.

See also

UK company law
Lifting the corporate veil

Notes

References

United Kingdom company case law
United Kingdom corporate personality case law
2000 in case law
2000 in British law
High Court of Justice cases